NGC 788 is a lenticular galaxy located in the constellation Cetus. It was discovered in a sky survey by Wilhelm Herschel on September 10, 1785. Studies of NGC 788 indicate that it, while itself being classified as a Seyfert 2, contains an obscured Seyfert 1 nucleus, following the detection of a broad Hα emission line in the polarized flux spectrum. The observation also indicated the lowest radio luminosities observed in an obscured Seyfert 1.

References 

Lenticular galaxies
Cetus (constellation)
0788